Paderborn Lippstadt Airport (German: Flughafen Paderborn Lippstadt)  is a minor international airport in the Ostwestfalen-Lippe area in the German state of North Rhine-Westphalia. It mainly serves flights to European leisure destinations.

History
Paderborn Lippstadt Airport opened in 1971. 

The terminal offers several facilities for travelers: travel agencies, a restaurant, shops, car rental agencies and a visitors deck. The apron features five stands for mid-sized aircraft such as the Airbus A320 of which three are equipped with jet bridges. There are also several stands for smaller general aviation aircraft.

A conference centre with several conference rooms can be found at the airport and a hotel was opened there in October 2006. An industrial park with several companies is located in the close vicinity. In 2010, 1.03 million passed through the airport. Ever since, passenger numbers have been decreasing. In September 2015, German leisure airline Condor announced the termination of all operations at Paderborn Lippstadt Airport. All ten year-round and seasonal routes to destinations around the Mediterranean ceased by 26 October 2015.

In January 2019, Adria Airways announced it would end its short-lived operations at the airport which consisted of routes to London (which already ceased in late 2018), Vienna and Zürich. In October 2019, Lufthansa announced the termination of their route to Frankfurt Airport by March 2020, leaving Paderborn/Lippstadt with a sole hub connection to Munich Airport.

In August 2020, the airport company announced its intention to file for insolvency while maintaining business operations in the wake of the COVID-19 pandemic.

Airlines and destinations
The following airlines operate regular scheduled and charter flights at Paderborn Lippstadt Airport:

The nearest larger international airport is Dortmund Airport approx.  to the west.

Statistics

Ground transportation
The airport is located next to the Autobahn A 44 (exit Büren) and can also be reached via Autobahn A 33 (exit Salzkotten). There is a bus shuttle from the main station in Paderborn.

See also
 Transport in Germany
 List of airports in Germany

References

External links

 Official website
 
 

Airports in North Rhine-Westphalia
Buildings and structures in North Rhine-Westphalia
Paderborn